Lankarama is a stupa built by King Valagamba, in an ancient place at Galhebakada in the ancient kingdom of Anuradhapura, Sri Lanka. Nothing is known about the ancient form of the stupa, and later this was renovated. The ruins show that there are rows of stone pillars and it is no doubt that there has been a house built encircling the stupa (vatadage) to cover it.

Eth pokuna
The eth pokuna (elephant pond) is an ancient man-made pond situated close to Lankaramaya.

The water to this pond is supplied from the Periyamkulama Tank through a network of underground canals. These underground canals still work after several hundreds years. This tank was probably used by the monks in the Abhayagiri vihāra (Buddhist monastery), which at one time had over five thousand priests.

See also
 Atamasthana

External links 

 This page incorporates content from  Dr. Rohan Hettiarachchi's  used with permission of website owner.

Archaeological protected monuments in Anuradhapura District
Buddhist temples in Anuradhapura District
Stupas in Anuradhapura
Vatadages